The Tyrone Intermediate Football Club Championship (known for sponsorship reasons as the LCC Group Tyrone Intermediate Football Club Championship) is an annual Gaelic football competition contested by mid-tier Tyrone GAA clubs.

In 2022, the Irish Independent said of Tyrone's football championship: "Tyrone can rightly lay claim to [be] the most competitive... of them all"

Galbally Pearses are the title holders (2022) defeating Edendork St Malachy's in the final.

History
The tournament was first held in 1962, with Cookstown the first champions defeating Galbally in the final.

The semi-final of the 2021 Tyrone Intermediate Football Championship was abandoned after eight minutes and an Air Ambulance had to land on the pitch at Healy Park to care for the injured.

From 2018, all championship games have been streamed live on Tyrone TV.

Format
The 16 clubs in Division 2 of the All-County Football League in Tyrone compete on a straight knockout basis.

Honours
The trophy presented to the winners is the Paddy Cullen Cup. The winners of the Tyrone Intermediate Football Championship qualify for the Ulster Intermediate Club Football Championship, representing their county, later that year.

The winners can then go on to compete in the All-Ireland Intermediate Club Football Championship.

The winners of the Tyrone Intermediate Football Championship also gain promotion to Division 1 (until 2007 Division 1B) of the Tyrone All-County Football league for the following season, regardless of their final standing in the Division 2 league that year. Therefore as the winners compete in the Tyrone Senior Football Championship the following year, the holders do not defend their title.

List of finals

Wins listed by club

 Donaghmore St Patrick's (4): 1965, 1968, 1988, 1996

 Dungannon Thomas Clarkes (4): 1963, 1972, 2001, 2014

 Edendork St Malachy's (4): 1969, 1985, 2015, 2020

 Cookstown Fr. Rock's (4): 1962, 1964, 2009, 2012

 Clonoe O'Rahilly's (4):  1976, 1979, 1983, 1995

 Pomeroy Plunketts (4):  1967, 1991, 2004, 2016

 Eglish St Patrick's (2): 1992, 1997

 Stewartstown Harps (2): 1980, 2006

 Moortown St Malachy's (2): 1975, 2021

 Killyman St Mary's (2): 1973, 2007

 Kildress Wolfe Tones (2): 1971, 2011

 Moy Tír Na nÓg (2): 1982, 2017

 Aghaloo O'Neills (2): 2002, 2005

 Aghyaran St Davog's (2): 1981, 1987

 Beragh Red Knights (2): 1993, 2000

 Galbally Pearses (2): 2019, 2022

 Gortin St Patrick's (1): 2003

 Killeeshil St Mary's (1): 1986

 Owen Roe O'Neill's (1): 1970

 Omagh St Enda's (1): 1977

 Fintona Pearses (1): 1978

 Coalisland Na Fianna (1): 1984

 Drumquin Wolfe Tones (1): 1994

 Clann na nGael (1): 1998

 Brackaville Owen Roes (1): 1999

 Ardboe O'Donovan Rossa GAC (1): 1990

 Trillick St Macartan's (1): 2008

 Derrylaughan Kevin Barrys (1): 2010

 Eskra Emmetts (1): 2013

 Tattyreagh St Patrick's (1): 2018

 Dromore (1): 1974

 Augher St Macartan's (1): 1966

References

2
Intermediate Gaelic football county championships